Takhtgah-e Safi Yar Soltan (also Romanized as Takhtgāh-e Şafī Yār Solţān and Takhtgāh-e Şafīyār Solţān) is a village in Gurani Rural District, Gahvareh District, Dalahu County, Kermanshah Province, Iran. At the 2006 census, its population was 88, in 18 families.

References 

Populated places in Dalahu County